Winckworth Allan Gay (1821–1910) was an American landscape artist and was one of the first American artists to promote the Barbizon style of pastoral landscape painting. He studied art in the United States, including West Point and then France and the far east, and came to produce many landscapes during his extended tours of these places. Gay produced many works during his life time, all the way up to his last few final years.

Early life 
Winckworth Allan Gay was born at Hingham,  Massachusetts on August 18, 1821. After completing his common education in public schools, he received his early art education from Robert Walter Weir, at Westpoint, New York. Thereafter he spent four years in Europe, where he studied with Constant Troyon in Paris. He became one of the first Americans to espouse the Barbizon style of landscape painting. Gay's older brother was Sydney Howard Gay an abolitionist and the editor of National Anti-Slavery Standard. At the age of seventeen Gay attended West Point at the United States Military Academy and studied under Robert Walter Weir, the resident professor of drawing where Gay obtained a sound foundation in drawing and art. Winckworth had a nephew, Walter Gay, who was also a noted painter of French subjects and spent much time painting in France.

Career
In 1847 Gay went to France and continued his studies under Constant Troyon in Paris, who influenced Gay's the formation his  sober and personal style which became characteristic of Gay's work. While in Paris, he met Benjamin Champney, also from New England, and went on sketching trips together in much of Europe. After studying with Troyon at his Paris studio Gay visited Italy, Switzerland, and Holland. After returning to the United States he set up his studio in Boston. After he settled he often traveled to the White Mountains in New Hampshire, often visiting the artist's colony at West Compton.

Gay returned to Europe in 1874, and eventually visited Egypt, China and Japan. During his four year tour in Japan, he produced a number of paintings with subjects that included canals, temples, and old castles, and which have been described as his Orienalis work.<

In the 1850s Gay exhibited his paintings at the Boston Athenæum which were displayed alongside works by notable European masters such as William Holman Hunt, and Narcisse Virgilio Díaz and Jean-François Millet, serving as "proud reminders" that Boston artists were well-versed in the latest art trends in Europe. 

His unique talent was to integrate the Barbizon style of painting with the more well-known Hudson River School style. His work was very popular with collectors. During his lifetime, his work appeared at the Boston Art Club, and the National Academy of Design.

In 1877, he traveled to the far East for an overall tour lasting five years. He spent a winter in China, working in and around Hong Kong, Canton, and Macao. He spent the following winter in India, with the remainder of his time visiting Japan, where he made lengthy sojourns at Tokio, Yokohama, and Kioto, along with time spent in various smaller towns. His return home was made by way of Europe, where he spent two years or in Paris. Gay set up an exhibition in Boston which contained over a hundred of his sketches and paintings, including landscapes he painted while in Egypt, Holland, Italy, the far east, and America.

His work is in the Smithsonian American Art Museum, the Brooklyn Museum of Art, and the Museum of Fine Arts.

During his career as a painter, Gay exhibited his works at the Brooklyn Art Association in 1872 and 1879, the Boston Art Club from 1873-1877, the Pennsylvania Academy of Fine Arts, and the National Academy of Design in 1869 and 1875. Today his works are on display at the Boston Athenaeum and the Hingham Historical Society. His sketchbook is held at the Archives of American Art.

Selected works

Final days and legacy

Gay spent the last few years of his life in retirement at his hometown in West Hingham, where he died in 1910 at the age of eighty-nine, and is buried in Hingham Cemetery in Hingham, Plymouth County, Massachusetts. He was never married. In artist Samuel Isham's opinion, Gay did not achieve the measure of fame he deserved, maintaining that his paintings were characterized by "simplicity and truth".

Citations

Sources
 

  <ref>Rossiter (ed.), 1906, v. 4 (no page numbers, alphabetically listed)<ref>

Further reading
Ackerman, G.M., American Orientalists, ACR, 1994; especially p. 274

External links
http://www.artnet.com/artists/winckworth%20allan-gay/
http://www.askart.com/askart/artist.aspx?artist=21380
http://www.mmefineart.com/pop_gay_seaside.htm

1821 births
1910 deaths
19th-century American painters
20th-century American painters
American male painters
Orientalist painters
19th-century American male artists
20th-century American male artists